Metachrostis egens is a moth of the family Erebidae first described by Frederic Moore in 1884. It is found in Sri Lanka.

References

Moths of Asia
Moths described in 1884
Boletobiinae